Percy Dickie (11 December 1907 – 1987) was a Scottish footballer who played as an inside forward or left half.

He began his senior career at hometown club Aberdeen in 1929 but was unable to establish himself as a regular, and after starting a fourth season in a backup role at Pittodrie he moved on to fellow top-tier club St Johnstone, helping them to finish high up the table (under manager Tommy Muirhead the Perth side finished fifth in both 1932–33 and 1934–35). His performances drew the attention of English clubs and he signed for Blackburn Rovers in September 1937 for a £1,200 transfer fee.

Never a frequent goalscorer playing as a forward, he was deployed in a more defensive role at Ewood Park, where he spent two 'regular' seasons – he was part of the squad which gained promotion as winners of the 1938–39 Second Division title, though interrupted by injuries – prior to the outbreak of World War II. During the conflict he was a Physical Training Instructor in the British Army and made appearances for the likes of Blackburn, Aberdeen, Clachnacuddin and St Mirren in unofficial competitions. He never played at the professional level again but featured in the Highland Football League and later had a coaching role at Aberdeen where he also ran a business.

References

1907 births
1987 deaths
Military personnel from Aberdeen
Date of death missing
Footballers from Aberdeen
Scottish footballers
Association football inside forwards
Association football wing halves
Association football coaches
Scottish Junior Football Association players
English Football League players
Scottish Football League players
Highland Football League players
Dyce Juniors F.C. players
St Johnstone F.C. players
Blackburn Rovers F.C. players
Aberdeen F.C. players
Buckie Thistle F.C. players
Peterhead F.C. players
Aberdeen F.C. wartime guest players
St Mirren F.C. wartime guest players
Aberdeen F.C. non-playing staff
Forres Mechanics F.C. players
British Army personnel of World War II
Royal Army Physical Training Corps soldiers